The Carfax Conduit was a water conduit that supplied the city of Oxford with water from 1610 until 1869.

The conduit ran in an underground lead pipe from a spring on the hillside above the village of North Hinksey, beneath Seacourt Stream and the River Thames, to a building at Carfax in the centre of Oxford. The system was built by Otho Nicholson, a London lawyer, to supply the citizens of Oxford with clean water. It replaced a system built by Osney Abbey between 1205 and 1221 that had fallen into disrepair.

By 1787 it had become an obstacle to traffic and it was removed in 1797 and replaced by a smaller cistern. The original structure was given to the Earl Harcourt, who had it re-erected in the grounds of his home, Nuneham House, where it remains to this day. Two plaques are attached to opposite sides of the building, giving a short history in English and Latin. The re-erected conduit is a Grade I listed building and scheduled monument.

A building, now called the Conduit House, was built at Harcourt Hill over the spring. It remains in situ and is in the care of English Heritage. The Conduit House site is designated as a Grade II* listed building and a scheduled monument.

The entire system fell into disuse in the 19th century. In 1869, when it was carrying very little water, the conduit was sold to Oxford Corporation.

Locations

Conduit House 
Carfax 
Cistern, now at Nuneham House

Notes

References
Hibbert, Christopher (ed.) (1988) The Encyclopaedia of Oxford; associate editor: Edward Hibbert. London: Macmillan 
 

Buildings and structures in Oxfordshire
English Heritage sites in Oxfordshire
Grade I listed buildings in Oxfordshire
Grade II* listed buildings in Oxfordshire
Scheduled monuments in Oxfordshire
Aqueducts in England
Buildings and structures completed in 1617
Infrastructure completed in 1617
1617 establishments in England